Hugo Dieter Stinnes (12 February 1870 – 10 April 1924) was a German industrialist and politician. During the late era of the German Empire and early Weimar Republic, he was considered to be one of the most influential entrepreneurs in Europe.

Life and career

Early life 
Stinnes was born in Mülheim, in the Ruhr Valley, North German Confederation. His parents Hermann Hugo (1842–1887) and Adeline Stinnes (1844–1925), and his grandfather, Matthias Stinnes, had founded a modest enterprise in Mülheim.

After passing his graduating examination from a secondary school (Realschule), young Stinnes was placed in an office at Koblenz where he received business training. In order to get a practical knowledge of mining, he worked for a few months as a miner at the Wiethe colliery. Then, in 1889, he attended a course of instruction at the Academy of Mining in Berlin (in 1916 merged into the Berlin Institute of Technology). In 1890, he inherited his father's coal mining and other financial enterprises.

Building a conglomerate 
Gradually, from working in the coal industry, he purchased his own shipyard. He also began to purchase seagoing vessels as well as river steamers and barges, the latter—especially on the Rhine—on a constantly increasing scale. He next organized an extensive international business in coal, and had 13 steamers trading to and from North Sea, Baltic, Mediterranean and Black Sea ports. They carried coal, wood, grain and iron ore. By the age of 23, Stinnes was heavily invested in the steel industry. He also imported great quantities of English coal and had an agency at Newcastle as well as an interest in some English mines. This led to his establishing branches of his business at Hamburg and at Rotterdam. 

Since its founding in 1898, Stinnes had been on the Board of Directors of the Rheinisch-Westfälisches Elektrizitätswerk Aktiengesellschaft (RWE). He envisioned using the steam from his mines to drive turbines for electricity production. As soon as Stinnes recognized RWE's potential he and steel magnate Fritz Thyssen bought shares to become the majority shareholder. The reason for RWE's rapid growth were the permits provided by the communities. However, since these concessions were time-limited, he chose to make the communities permanent shareholders, and gave each mayor a car.

During the First World War 
Before World War I, he was the possessor of a significant fortune which was vaguely estimated at several million pounds. He was a director of many of the largest industrial and mining companies of Westphalia, the Rhineland and Luxembourg. Business interests of this magnitude were constantly expanding, and he became interested in numerous subsidiary enterprises, such as tramways and the supply of electric power and light. He was always engaged in founding new companies or amalgamating existing ones. Stinnes managed to maintain an extensive and even a detailed knowledge of the working of all the companies in which he was engaged and, in all of them, to exact zealous and conscientious work from his business subordinates. The secret of his success was vertical integration and an essential unity of direction and coordination of aims in all branches of his enterprises.

When World War I broke out, Stinnes secured an enormous share in the war profits which enlarged the fortunes of the great industrialists. In enemy countries, his enterprises were sequestrated, and his firm at Rotterdam placed on the Allies' "black list". But, apart from the regular indemnification paid by the German government, he was richly compensated when he was called in by Erich Ludendorff as the most competent expert to give advice, to organize the coal and the industrial production of occupied Belgium and to help to set in motion the gigantic production of war material which the German general headquarters demanded.

During the war, Stinnes extended his activities in Hamburg, and in 1916 he bought up the Woermann and the East African steamship lines. In these new undertakings, he became associated with the two greatest German shipping companies, the Hamburg-American Line and the North German Lloyd. His Hamburg interests continued to multiply in something like geometrical progression. He purchased half a dozen landed estates in Saxony to supply timber for pit props. At Flensburg in Schleswig, he secured control of the largest Baltic shipping concern, and proceeded to build a new fleet of ships, christening one of them the "Hindenburg".

Investment in right-wing politics 

Stinnes' connection with Ludendorff led to his becoming an influence behind the scenes in German politics. A prominent capitalist and conservative, in 1918 he became a founding member of the Deutsche Volkspartei (German People's Party or DVP),  the new electioneering name of the former National Liberal Party. On his initiative, on January 10, 1919, Stinnes conducted a meeting of top representatives of the German economy in revolutionary Berlin and funded Antibolschewistenfonds (Anti-Bolshevist Fund) of the Anti-Bolshevist League, which distributed anti-communist propaganda and financed right wing groups such as the Freikorps. Captain Waldemar Pabst, who was responsible for the murder of Rosa Luxemburg and Karl Liebknecht, is said to have been financed through one of his confidantes. Already at the end of 1918 he had contributed around 4.4 million Reichsmark to the financing of the Alfred Hugenberg, which was supposed to carry nationalist propaganda to the population and which later became the nation-wide propaganda machine for Adolf Hitler's NSDAP.

In June 1920, after the German Revolution, Stinnes was elected to the Reichstag. He acted as spokesman for German industry towards trade unions and laid the foundation of today's system of cooperation between the unions and employers in Germany. The introduction of the eight-hour day is a prime example.

Stinnes denounced the Kapp Putsch as a senseless adventure, but at the same time made friendly gestures towards Wolfgang Kapp personally. Substantial support was provided by Stinnes to the NSDAP. It is assumed that it was his donations to the Nazi party treasury that created the financial base of the Beer Hall Putsch.

About the time of his election to the Reichstag, Stinnes began to buy up leading German newspapers, one of his main objects being to organize a solid and powerful bloc of opinion in Germany in support of law and order and the promotion of the highest industrial and commercial efficiency. His newspaper purchases included the Deutsche Allgemeine Zeitung in Berlin, formerly the organ of Otto von Bismarck and then of all the succeeding German governments, the Münchener Neueste Nachrichten and the München-Augsburger Zeitung, the latter being one of the oldest newspapers in Germany. Both of the Munich journals were previously exponents of a very much more democratic trend of opinion than that which came to characterize them under his proprietorship. Ancillary to these acquisitions, Stinnes secured large interests in paper mills in order to make his newspapers independent of the paper market.

Later life 
By the early 1920s, Stinnes was also using his influence in the press to attack the Versailles Treaty. Stinnes used his access to hard foreign currency during the period of inflation in the Weimar Republic to borrow vast sums in Reichsmark, repaying the loans with nearly worthless currency later.  This earned him the title of "" (Inflation King). In 1923, the American magazine Time called him "The New Emperor of Germany" to describe his far-reaching political influence and wealth.

In the 1920s, Stinnes was embroiled in a legal dispute with Mayer Wilderman.  Wilderman, who had been born in Bessarabia (then part of Russia), had set up a series of factories in Germany in 1912. However, at the outbreak of World War I, Stinnes seized the factories and deprived Wilderman of his assets, using the excuse that Wilderman was an "enemy alien". In 1918, Bessarabia became part of Romania, and Wilderman attempted to recover his assets. However, Stinnes delayed the process by disputing the facts surrounding Wilderman's birth, such as accusing Wilderman of forging his birth certificate, and used financial sleight of hand to pretend the assets had in fact been dissipated and, therefore, there was nothing that could be restored. 

Stinnes died in Berlin as a result of a gall bladder operation. Although his financial empire held some 4500 companies and 3000 manufacturing plants, it collapsed within a year of his death. Parts of his empire continued as Stinnes AG (now DB Mobility Logistics), Hugo Stinnes Schiffahrt and RWE, the second-largest energy supplier in Germany.

Family
In 1895, Hugo Stinnes married Cläre Wagenknecht; the couple had seven children: Edmund Hugo (1896–1980), Hugo Hermann (1897–1982), Clärenore (1901–1990), Otto (1903–1983), Hilde (1904–1975), Ernst (1911–1986), and Else (1913–1997).  Their daughter Clärenore was the first European woman to circumnavigate the world with an automobile in 1929.

His son Edmund Stinnes was a financier who left Germany and gave his home for the Secret Surrender negotiations in 1945 which brought WW2 to an end in Italy.

References

External links
 
 

1870 births
1924 deaths
German company founders
German mining businesspeople
German steel industry businesspeople
German industrialists
20th-century German businesspeople
Members of the Reichstag of the Weimar Republic
People from the Rhine Province
German People's Party politicians